Rahul Ramesh Shewale (born 14 April 1973) is an Indian politician from the Shiv Sena and the Lok Sabha member from the Mumbai South Central constituency.

Shewale is a four-time chairman of the standing committee of the Brihanmumbai Municipal Corporation (BMC), the municipal corporation of the city of Mumbai. He held the position from 2010 to 2014. His nomination for a fifth time was replaced by Yashodhar Phanse after he was declared a candidate for the Lok Sabha. He, along with his predecessor Ravindra Waikar, hold the record for being appointed the chairman of the BMC standing committee the most times.

Personal life
Rahul Shewale was born on 14 April 1973 to Ramesh Sambhaji Shewale, an Indian Navy officer and Jayashri Shewale, an employee of MTNL. His elder brother Avinash is a software engineer, who has settled in the United States, while his brother Navin is a doctor. He married fellow Shiv Sena politician and BMC corporator Kamini Mayekar (Kamini Shewale) on 14 February 2005. Kamini Shewale is a housewife. The couple have two sons: Swayam and Vedant.

Shewale is a Diploma holder in Civil Engineering from Government Polytechnic, Bandra.

Political career
Besides a four-time chairman of the all-powerful standing committee of the BMC, Shewale has also headed the Market and Garden Committee and the Ward Committee and was also a member of the Law Committee.

He was SS candidate from Trombay assembly seat in 2004 vidhansabha elections but lost to congress candidate.

Shewale, then a BMC corporator from Anushakti Nagar was nominated by his party as the National Democratic Alliance (NDA) candidate from Mumbai South Central constituency in the 2014 Indian general election. Shewale, a Dalit leader was fielded against the sitting 2-time MP and Dalit leader Eknath Gaikwad of the Congress party, which was part of the United Progressive Alliance (UPA).  Shewale got 3.8 lakh votes and won by a margin of 1.38 lakh over his nearest rival Gaikwad.

Controversy
An 33 year old woman filled a case against Rahul Shewale for alleged rape at the Metropolitan Magistrate's Court in Andheri .

Positions held
 Shakha Pramukh
 2002: Elected as corporator in BMC
 2007: Elected as corporator in Brihanmumbai Municipal Corporation 
 2012: Re-elected as corporator in Brihanmumbai Municipal Corporation 
 2012-2014: Standing Committee Chairman Brihanmumbai Municipal Corporation 
 2014 : Elected to 16th Lok Sabha
 2019 : Elected to 17th Lok Sabha

References

External links
 Official Website
 Shiv Sena official website 
 Rahul Shewale Lok Sabha Profile

Living people
1973 births
Shiv Sena politicians
People from Maharashtra
India MPs 2014–2019
India MPs 2019–present
Marathi politicians
Lok Sabha members from Maharashtra
Maharashtra municipal councillors
Politicians from Mumbai